Phyllonorycter ovalifoliae is a moth of the family Gracillariidae. It is known from the Nepal.

The wingspan is 7-7.5 mm.

The larvae feed on Lyonia ovalifolia. They mine the leaves of their host plant. The mine has the form of a very elongate, tentiformed blotch occurring upon the lower side of the leaf, always situated along the leaf-margin. The lower epidermis of the leaf at the mining part is dark brownish and much wrinkled in the well-matured stage, causing the leaf to fold almost downward.

References

ovalifoliae
Moths of Asia
Moths described in 1973